The Comunidade Intermunicipal das Terras de Trás-os-Montes (Mirandese: Tierras de Trás ls Montes; English: Lands of Trás-os-Montes) is an administrative division in northeastern Portugal. Since January 2015, Terras de Trás-os-Montes is also a NUTS3 subregion of Norte Region, that covers the same area as the intermunicipal community. The seat of the intermunicipal community is Bragança. Terras de Trás-os-Montes comprises a large part of the district of Bragança. The population in 2011 was 117,527, in an area of 5,543.61 km².

Municipalities

The intermunicipal community of Terras de Trás-os-Montes consists of 9 municipalities:

References

Intermunicipal communities of Portugal
Norte Region, Portugal